Deichmann SE is the largest footwear retailer in Europe which is headquartered in Essen, Germany.

Company structure 
Deichmann SE is a wholly owned family company. Among other countries, the company's stores are called Dosenbach in Switzerland and Van Haren in the Netherlands.

History

Founding years 1913–1940 
Heinrich Deichmann, born in 1888, opened a shoemaker's shop, called Schuhreparatur Elektra, in 1913 at the age of 25 in what is now Johannes-Brokamp-Straße in Borbeck, which was incorporated into the city of Essen two years later. At first, his customers were mainly miners from the then up-and-coming Ruhr area who needed inexpensive shoe repairs, being part of the lower income bracket. After World War I, Deichmann and his shoemakers produced their own shoes for the first time. Soon afterwards, Heinrich Deichmann bought cheap new goods from shoe factories to resell them to his own customers. Heinrich Deichmann opened the first large shoe shop at Borbecker Markt in 1936. His wife, Julie, took over the business after his death in 1940.

After World War II 
After World War II, Deichmann improvised by making 50,000 pairs of shoes out of poplar wood and parachute harnesses. In addition, a swap shop was set up for used shoes, quickly growing to a total of 5,000 customers on file. Early on, their son Heinz-Horst Deichmann helped out in the company, opening the first shop outside Essen on Ackerstraße in Düsseldorf in the late 1940s. He studied theology, received his doctorate in medicine and continued to run the small family business together with his mother. He gave up his career as a doctor in 1956 to fully take over management of the shoe business, buying out his four older sisters. By 1963, the company was operating 16 shops along the Rhine and in the Ruhr. Under Heinz-Horst Deichmann's management, the company grew to become the market leader in the German and European shoe retail trade. Deichmann was the first to introduce the display stands and later the rack-room concept in Germany, where shoes are presented in boxes for customers to try on directly.

International expansion and acquisitions 
The company acquired the Dosenbach shoe chain in Switzerland in 1973, followed by shoe and sports chain Ochsner in 1992. The two chains were merged to form Dosenbach-Ochsner. Their names are still used today for the branches located in Switzerland. The company expanded to the USA in 1984, the Netherlands in 1985, Austria in 1992 and Poland in 1997. Heinz-Horst Deichmann's son Heinrich Otto took over as chairman of the board in 1999. His sisters do not work for the company. In 2001, branches were opened in Hungary and the United Kingdom. This was followed by Denmark and the Czech Republic in 2003, Slovakia in 2004, Slovenia and Turkey in 2006, Romania in 2007 and Bulgaria in 2009. Germany's thousandth branch was opened in 2006. The company was legally changed to a Societas Europaea company on 1 January 2010. Deichmann opened its first stores in France and Belgium in 2017. The group had a total of  4,205 branches worldwide in 2019.

In the US, Deichmann SE completed the largest acquisition in the company's history by purchasing the KicksUSA chain in 2018 with over 60 stores in the streetwear and athletic shoe sector. China also began activities on the Chinese market in 2019 and opened its first branches in Estonia, Latvia and Dubai.

Deichmann was the first company to set up an online shop for shoes in 2000. The company currently runs 40 (2017: 36) online shops internationally and is working to expand its Omnichannel concept.

Market positioning 

During the 2019 fiscal year, the Deichmann Group sold around 183 million pairs of shoes worldwide, some 40% of which in Germany. As of 31 December 2019, the group employed around 43,000 employees in 30 countries and is the European shoe retail market leader.

Deichmann does not produce its own shoes, instead purchasing shoes in about 40 countries. Its primary purchasing market is Asia.

Deichmann purchased traditional brands Gallus and Elefanten-Schuh in May 2005. Gallus is a shoe factory founded by Mönchengladbach shoemaker Heinrich Vogels in 1880, which was based in Dülken until 1997. The name Gallus goes back to the Hahn family of manufacturers in Göttingen (Latin: Gallus), from whom Heinrich Vogels acquired the rights to the brand in the 1930s. Elefanten-Schuh (Kleve) was closed down by English shoe manufacturer Clarks in late 2004 after failing to find a suitable investor. Since then, shoes that Deichmann purchases from suppliers have been sold under the brand names Elefanten and Gallus. Deichmann does not produce its own shoes.

The Pussycat Dolls collaborated with Deichmann on testimonial advertisements, beginning in March 2006. Extreme athlete and musician Joey Kelly appeared in advertising for Deichmann's Victory brand of running shoes. The Sugababes collection was released in the spring of 2008, with their song "Denial" used in the campaign's television advertising. American supermodel Cindy Crawford brought her own shoe collection to market exclusively for Deichmann under the 5th Avenue label in 2009. Halle Berry appeared in advertising for Deichmann in 2012. Sylvie Meis presented her first Deichmann shoe collection in 2015, with additional collections released in 2016 and 2017. Ellie Goulding also released her own collection for Deichmann in 2017. Deichmann collaborated with singer Rita Ora to release a collection of 40 women's shoe designs in 2019.

Dosenbach took over title sponsorship of the second highest level football league in Switzerland for one season, which was called the Dosenbach Challenge League during that time.

Public perception

2003: Founding member of the amfori BSCI (Business Social Compliance Initiative) 
Deichmann is a member of the BSCI. More than 2,400 retailers and companies from 46 countries are part of the initiative. They pursue common goals, including improving working conditions in factories, helping suppliers adapt to national laws and international guidelines, and facilitating socially responsible behaviour in the globalised economy.

2012–2014: Chromium (VI) oxide pollution 
According to RAPEX, the EU rapid alert system for unsafe consumer products and consumer protection, there were multiple reports of leather shoes produced under the company's own 5th Avenue brand being contaminated by chromium trioxide between 2012 and 2014.

2018: Member of the Cads association 
Deichmann SE is a member of the Cads association (cooperation for assuring defined standards for shoe and leather goods production). In 2018, the initiative, which was launched in 2007, became a registered association with some 80 members. These include companies from the footwear and leather goods industry, brands, retailers, test laboratories and chemical manufacturers. Cads is committed to sustainable development in the footwear and leather goods industry along the entire value chain. All members agree to abide by jointly defined production and environmental standards.

Member of the Leather Working Group 
Deichmann SE is a member of the Leather Working Group, which was founded in 2005. The multi-stakeholder initiative brings together brands, manufacturers, retailers and leading technical experts from the leather industry and non-governmental organisations. Its aim is to make the production chain in leather processing more transparent. In addition, it aims to bring about sustainable changes to processing in tanneries and through distributors, including by reducing water and energy consumption. In addition, it calls for occupational health and safety in factories to be monitored using a specially developed audit protocol.

Social engagement

Deichmann Sponsorship Award 
Deichmann is committed to the professional integration of disadvantaged children and young people. The Sponsorship Award, which was launched by Heinrich Deichmann in 2005, rewards initiatives that develop creative, sustainable efforts to integrate people with an immigrant background into professional life and society.

The Sponsorship Award comes with a total of 100,000 euros of prize money and is awarded in three categories:
 Professional support by companies, associations and public initiatives
 Professional support by associations and public initiatives
 School-based preventive programmes

Actress and television presenter Fernanda Brandão became a patron of the Sponsorship Award in 2019.

"Wort und Tat" foundation 
Heinz-Horst Deichmann founded the "Wort und Tat" foundation in 1977. The organisation has maintained DZI Seal of Approval status since 1992. The foundation is active in India, Tanzania, Moldova, Greece and Germany. In collaboration with local partners, needy people receive support in matters of education, health, sustainability and emergency aid.

Among others, major projects include:

 Moldova: Help for poor segments of the population (project launched in 2007)
 Greece: Help for refugees and poor Greeks (project launched in 1980)
 India: Help for people in rural areas (project launched in 1988)
 Tanzania: Help for a population group in the south (project launched in 1996)

Deichmann-Stiftung 
The Dr. Heinz-Horst Deichmann-Stiftung promotes various social and welfare-based projects in Germany and abroad. The projects are based in the fields of child and youth welfare, development aid and development cooperation, emergency aid and disaster relief, art and culture, education, science and research, health, public health and public healthcare.

The projects receiving support in Germany include Stern im Norden e.V., which provides assistance in the socially deprived area of Dortmund's Nordstadt district. During the COVID-19 pandemic, the Deichmann-Stiftung engaged in multiple initiatives, including donating one million face masks to the Caritas organisation in the Archdiocese of Berlin in May 2020.

International engagement 
Deichmann subsidiaries in Hungary, the Czech Republic, Slovakia, Italy, Austria, Poland, the United Kingdom and the United States support numerous social projects in each of these countries. Children's homes, hospices and educational projects receive support, primarily through donations.

Further reading

References

External links 
 Deichmann official website
 Deichmann corporate site in new English version
 "Wort und Tat" foundation website

Companies based in Essen
Footwear retailers
Retail companies established in 1913
Shoe companies of Germany
1913 establishments in Germany